The violet-backed hyliota (Hyliota violacea) is a species of Hyliota.
It is found in Benin, Cameroon, Central African Republic, Republic of the Congo, Democratic Republic of the Congo, Ivory Coast, Equatorial Guinea, Gabon, Ghana, Guinea, Liberia, Nigeria, Rwanda, Sierra Leone, and Togo.
Its natural habitats are subtropical or tropical dry forest and subtropical or tropical moist lowland forest.

References

violet-backed hyliota
Birds of Central Africa
Birds of West Africa
violet-backed hyliota
Taxonomy articles created by Polbot